The Wittman D-12 "Bonzo" was an air racer designed by Steve Wittman for the Thompson Trophy races. The aircraft's top speed of  made it faster than any United States military aircraft of the era.

Development
Wittman purchased a Curtiss D-12 engine in 1934, and designed "Bonzo" around it. In 1935, it took part in the Thompson Trophy Race. In 1936, a spring steel landing gear was installed. Ram air was added for the carburetors, and modified several times to get even fuel pressure.

Design
"Bonzo" featured a mid-winged taildragger design with a small squarish cross-section. The aircraft was finished in red and silver, like Wittman's smaller racer "Chief Oshkosh". The spinner featured a center cut-out to provide cooling air to a radiator. The wings were made of wood with aircraft fabric covering and closely spaced wing ribs.

Operational history
"Bonzo" was not ready for the 1934 National Air Races in time. 
1936 National Air RacesBonzo catches fire en route at Cheyenne, Wyoming.
1938 National Air RacesThird place with a leaking radiator.
1939 National Air RacesFifth place.

The D-12 engine was sold to the Falin Propeller Co. for propeller testing throughout World War II.

Variants
 Only one Wittman D-12 "Bonzo" was built, but Wittman used the name "Bonzo" again on his second midget racer patterned after the Wittman Buster.

Aircraft on display 
The D-12 "Bonzo" was donated by Wittman to anchor the EAA Airventure Museum in Oshkosh, Wisconsin in December 1959, it was later restored for display in 1982.

Specifications (Wittman D-12 Bonzo)

References

Racing aircraft
D-12
United States sport aircraft
Single-engined tractor aircraft
Mid-wing aircraft
Aircraft first flown in 1935